Kirtikar is an Indian surname. Notable people with the surname include:

 Gajanan Kirtikar (born 1943), Indian politician
 Kanhoba Ranchoddas Kirtikar (1849–1917), botanist and Army surgeon

Indian surnames